A cardinal mark is a sea mark (a buoy or other floating or fixed structure) used in maritime pilotage to indicate the position of a hazard and the direction of safe water.

Cardinal marks indicate the direction of safety as a cardinal (compass) direction (north, east, south or west) relative to the mark. This makes them meaningful regardless of the direction or position of the approaching vessel, in contrast to the (perhaps better-known) lateral mark system.

Characteristics 
The characteristics and meanings of cardinal marks are as defined by the International Association of Lighthouse Authorities.

A cardinal mark indicates one of the four compass directions by:

 the direction of its two conical top-marks, which can both point up, indicating north; down, indicating south; towards each other, indicating west; or away from each other, indicating east
 its distinctive pattern of black and yellow stripes, which follows the orientation of the cones - the black stripe is in the position pointed to by the cones (e.g. at the top for a north cardinal, in the middle for a west cardinal)
 optionally, its distinctive sequence of flashing light, which consists of a sequence of quick or very quick flashes whose number gives the clockface position which corresponds to the direction of the cardinal (e.g. three for an east cardinal, nine for a west; north has continuous flashes, and south may be augmented with a long flash, to help distinguish it from a west in difficult conditions)

Either a quick or a very quick sequence of light flashes may be used; the choice allows for two similar nearby marks to be uniquely identified by their lights.

A cardinal mark may be used to accomplish the following:

Indicate that the deepest water is an area on the named side of the mark
Indicate the safe side on which to pass a danger
Draw attention to a feature in a channel, such as a bend, junction, branch, or end of a shoal
Draw attention to a new danger such as a grounded ship. In such cases two equal marks are often placed together to indicate that it's a newly marked danger and is not yet printed in official charts.

Other uses:

Sometimes a Cardinal Mark can be used instead of a Special mark to indicate a spoil ground, or an outfall pipe for example. A few examples can be seen on the South Coast of England and in Northern France.

Mnemonics
The north and south topmarks are self-explanatory (both cones pointing up, or both pointing down).  Remembering the east and west marks can be more of a problem.

 The topmarks for east and west "follow the Sun"—the top cone points in the direction in which the Sun appears to move (rising for an east mark or setting for a west mark), while the bottom cone points in the direction in which its reflection on the ocean surface appears to move.  The Sun and its reflection move away from each other on rising and toward each other on setting.
 East looks like an Easter egg.  The western mark has a pinched waist: "Western women have wasp waists".
 East looks like a classical letter E/epsilon.  The western mark looks like a "W" on its side, or "West winds wool" (looks like a bobbin)
 East is larger around the middle: "Equatorially enlarged".  West is a woman's waist.
 West looks like a wine glass with the narrow stem and wide top and bottom.

The colours can be remembered this way:  The two conical top-marks always point to black.
If the top-marks point to the top, black is at the top.
If the top-marks point to the bottom, black is at the bottom.
If the top-marks point to the middle, black is at the middle.
If the top-marks point to the outside, black is at the outside.

Examples

See also

References

Citations

Navigational buoys